Kavadh ( Kawād;  Qobād) may refer to:

Kay Kawād, mythological figure of Iranian folklore and oral tradition.
Kavadh I, Sasanian king (r. 488–531)
Kavadh II, Sasanian king (r. 628)
Qubad Kamran, a character in the Hamzanama